The Defender is a Czech drama television series, that premiered on Czech Television in 2021. Series also appeared at Serial Killer festival. It won Czech Film Critics' Award in category "Outside Kino."

Series focuses on a teacher Aleš Pelán who becomes School Ombudsman to stand up for children, parents and teachers in need. Pelán's cases include teacher bullied by her students, investigation of a pupil's suicide, girl who has never attended school, parents of students harassed by their classmate or sexual abuse of students by their teacher. All episodes are inspired by real cases.

Cast
Lukáš Vaculík as Aleš Pelán
Iveta Dušková as Jana Pelánová
Jaroslav Plesl as Pavel Havlík
Barbora Kodetová as Marta Beková
Agáta Červinková as Barbora Černá
Pavel Řezníček as Petr Starý
Jiří Havelka as Marcel Suchý
Petra Hřebíčková as Kristýna Kurzová
Jan Vondráček as inspektor Jarošík
Lucie Ducháčková as Sára Jermanová
Vladimír Javorský as MUDr. Luboš Pivec
Miroslav Vladyka as Václav Škvára

Episodes

References

External links

2020s Czech television series
Czech crime television series
Czech drama television series
2021 Czech television series debuts
Czech Television original programming
Czech Lion Awards winners (television series)